Ants (family Formicidae in the order Hymenoptera) are the most species-rich of all social insects, with more than 12,000 described species and many others awaiting description. Formicidae is divided into 21 subfamilies, of which 17 contain extant taxa, while four are exclusively fossil. Ants have come to occupy virtually all major terrestrial habitats, with the exception of tundra and cold ever-wet forests. They display a wide range of social behaviors, foraging habits and associations with other organisms, which has generated scientific and public interest.

Clades
Beginning in the 1990s, molecular (DNA sequence) data have come to play a central role in attempts to reconstruct the ant "tree of life". Molecular phylogenetic analyses based on multiple nuclear genes have yielded robust results that reinforce some preexisting views but overturn others – and suggest that there has been considerable morphological convergence among some ant lineages. Molecular data provide very strong support for a novel group, the "formicoid clade", not revealed by previous morphological work. This clade comprises 9 of the 16 extant ant subfamilies and about 90% of all described ant species. Formicoids include such widespread and species-rich subfamilies as Myrmicinae, Formicinae and Dolichoderinae, as well as the army ants (Dorylinae). Non-formicoids comprise five "poneroid" subfamilies (Agroecomyrmecinae, Amblyoponinae, Paraponerinae, Ponerinae, and Proceratiinae), Leptanillinae, about which little is known, and Martialinae, the most recently discovered subfamily. Relationships among these remaining seven subfamilies are less well resolved. A recent study (2011) places Leptanillinae as a sister group to all other ants, with Martialinae, the poneroids and formicoids forming a clade.

Evolution of ants
Ants first arose during the mid-Cretaceous, more than 100 million years ago, associated with the rise of flowering plants and an increase in forest ground litter. The earliest known ants evolved from a lineage within the aculeate wasps, and a recent study suggests that they are a sister group of Apoidea. During the Cretaceous ants were confined to the northern Laurasian supercontinent, with only a few widespread primitive species. By the middle Eocene, around 50 million years ago, ants had diversified and become ecologically dominant as predators and scavengers. Ant species are less than 2% of the total number of insect species but make up one third of the insect biomass.

History of classification

In volume 1 of Systema Naturae, Carl Linnaeus (1758) described seventeen species of ants, all of which he placed in the single genus Formica. Within a few decades additional genera had been recognized, and this trend continued in the ensuing years, together with the development of a more complex hierarchical classification in which genera were apportioned among subfamilies and tribes. The ant species described by Linnaeus are now dispersed in eleven different genera, belonging to four subfamilies.

For much of the twentieth century the number of recognized ant subfamilies varied from seven to ten, with the Aneuretinae, Cerapachyinae, Leptanillinae, Myrmeciinae and Pseudomyrmecinae being variously treated as separate subfamilies or (at different times) subsumed within Dolichoderinae, Ponerinae, Dorylinae, Ponerinae, and Myrmicinae, respectively. In 2014, Brady et al. synonymized the army ant subfamilies and their closest relatives under Dorylinae; this clade, the dorylomorph subfamilies, previously also contained Aenictinae, Aenictogitoninae, Cerapachyinae, Ecitoninae and Leptanilloidinae.

The last three decades have seen a proliferation of subfamily names, as a result of three factors: (1) the realization that some subfamilies were assemblages of unrelated taxa; (2) abandonment of paraphyletic taxa, and (3) the discovery of novel fossil taxa. Seventeen extant subfamilies of ants are currently recognized, along with four extinct subfamilies. One of the fossil taxa, Armaniinae, is often given family rank within the superfamily Formicoidea. About 13 genera are incertae sedis (of uncertain placement), and are not assigned to any subfamily.

Subfamilies
Extinct taxa are indicated by a †.

See also
List of ant genera
Poneromorph subfamilies

Notes

References

 This article incorporates text from a scholarly publication published under the Creative Commons Attribution 3.0 Unported License: . Please check the source for the exact licensing terms.

Wikipedia articles incorporating text from open access publications
 
Ants
Subfamilies
Subfamilies